Sauchie is a town in the Central Lowlands of Scotland. It lies north of the River Forth and south of the Ochil Hills, within the council area of Clackmannanshire.

History 
The name means the place or field of the willows. The land originally belonged to Clan Campbell, being mentioned in connection with Cailean Mór and Gilleasbaig of Menstrie. In  1321 Robert the Bruce granted the lands of Sauchie to Henry de Annand, former Sheriff of Clackmannan. A tower was built in 1335, and the present Sauchie Tower is on the same site. The extant tower was built before 1431 when Mary de Annand, the co-heiress to the estate, married Sir James Schaw of Greenock.
The tower is all that remains of the village which developed within its protective radius. In the early 18th century the Schaw family moved from the tower to the more comfortable Newtonschaw. The village developed a brick works by the River Devon which fell into disuse following the collapse of the local mining industry.

The rare and typically Scottish New Sauchie or Auchinbaird Vaulted Tower Windmill stands on a ridge overlooking New Sauchie and dates from the late 17th or early 18th century. It was a grain mill and later converted to a dovecote and has been preserved as a landscape feature and tourist attraction.

Sport 
The village has a strong footballing tradition and is home to the football club Sauchie, who compete in the East of Scotland League. The club was founded in 1960 and play their home games at Beechwood Park in Sauchie. The village is also home to several youth teams including Claremont Football Club.

New Sauchie 
New Sauchie is a relatively modern settlement developed around the Holton Village area to house miners working in the Earl of Mar's
colliery at the Holton mine, and Newtonschaw, a village housing servants of the Schaw family. Schawpark Golf Course lies on the site of the Schaw family estate which is no longer extant.

Notable people 
 Robert Carberry (born 1931), footballer
 Grant Gilchrist (born 1990), Scotland and Edinburgh rugby player
 Alan Hansen (born 1955), footballer
 John Hansen (born 1950), footballer
 Willie Morgan (born 1944), footballer
 William Schaw (c. 1550–1602), mason and courtier
 Robert Shaw (died 1527), Bishop of Moray
 John Stahl (1953–2022), actor
 Prof. David Wilson (born 1957), criminologist

See also 
List of places in Clackmannanshire

References 

Sauchie and Alloa - A People's History, John Adamson, 1988

External links 

 Sauchie Community Website
 Sauchie Library

Villages in Clackmannanshire
Alloa